"U Should've Known Better" is a song by American recording artist Monica. It was written in collaboration with Harold Lilly and Jermaine Dupri, and produced by the latter along with frequent co-producer Bryan Michael Cox for her original third studio album, All Eyez on Me (2002). When the album was shelved for release outside Japan, the song was one out of five original records that were transferred into its new version, After the Storm (2003). A contemporary R&B slow jam, "U Should've Known Better" contains elements of soul music and rock music. Built on an pulsating backbeat, the song's instrumentation consists of screeching guitars and an understated harp pattern. Lyrically, Monica, as the protagonist, delivers a message of loyalty to her imprisoned love interest and sings about staying down for him despite his doubts.

The song was generally well received by contemporary music critics who highlighted the heartfelt emotion and sadness. Released as the fourth and final single from After the Storm on March 8, 2004, the single marked Monica's first balladic release in over five years. On the charts, "U Should've Known Better" peaked at number 19 on the US Billboard Hot 100 and number 6 on the Hot R&B/Hip-Hop Singles & Tracks, becoming the album's highest-charting single release after "So Gone". Its accompanying music video was shot by director Benny Boom, and filmed in Mexico in April 2004. It features rapper Young Buck as Monica's love interest.

Background and release
In an interview with MTV News in June 2000, Monica revealed that she was planning to start work on a follow-up to her 1998 album The Boy Is Mine throughout the summer season, with a first single to be released by October of the same year. The following month, personal tribulations put a temporary halt on the album's production when her former boyfriend Jarvis "Knot" Weems committed suicide. In July 2000, Monica and Weems were together at the graveside of Weems's brother, who had died in an automobile accident at age 25 in 1998, when Weems, without warning, put a gun to his head and shot himself to death. Knot left behind a daughter from a previous relationship, who Monica took into care after going into hiatus. In early 2001, Monica eventually decided to resume recording to prepare the release of her third album in fall 2001. Throughout the process, Monica primarily worked with her usual stable of producers, which included Dallas Austin, production team Soulshock & Karlin, Bryan Michael Cox, and Rodney Jerkins and his Darkchild crew.  Though she "had never thought about writing much" by then, her producers encouraged the singer to intensify her work on the All Eyez on Me album and to write and contribute own lyrics and ideas to the songs, one of which was the ballad "U Should've Known Better."

Monica penned the song along with Harold Lilly and longtime contributor Jermaine Dupri, while production on the track was helmed by Dupri and Bryan Michael Cox. "U Should've Known Better" was mixed by Phil Tan with further assistance from Dupri and John Horesco IV. William Odum played the guitar, while recording at the SouthSide Studios in Atlanta, Georgia was overseen Brian Frye. He was assisted by Tadd Mingo, and Javier Valeverde. A sultry ballad, the lyrics of the song deal with misunderstandings in a relationship, which conduce to doubts about love's veracity. Nonetheless Monica, as the female protagonist, promises her man she'll stay with him, singing lines like: "It don't matter if you're up, matter if you're down, either way I'm gonna be around." When the US release of All Eyez on Me was shelved, the song was one out of five original records that were transferred into its new version, After the Storm. Although a duet with DMX, "Don't Gotta Go Home", was expected be released as the album's fourth single at times, "U Should've Known Better" eventually replaced original plans.

Chart performance
Released as the album's fourth and final single in March 2004, "U Should've Known Better" opened as the Hot Shot Debut of the week at number 72 on Billboards Hot R&B/Hip-Hop Singles & Tracks chart in the week of April 3, 2004. However, it took another three months until the song entered the Billboard Hot 100 chart, where it debuted at number 67 in the week of June 6, 2004, the second-highest debut of the week. "U Should've Known Better" remained twenty weeks on the chart, reaching its peak position of number 19 in its ninth week. It marked the second single from After the Storm to reach the top twenty on the Hot 100chart and, as the album's final single, would remain its second highest-charting offering behind leading single "So Gone."

Although never released on a CD single or CD maxi single format, "U Should've Known Better" was also successful on Billboard´s component charts. It reached number 6 on the Hot R&B/Hip-Hop Singles & Tracks—Monica's tenth non-consecutive top ten entry on that particular chart—as well as the top ten on the Hot R&B/Hip-Hop Airplay and the top twenty on the Hot 100 Airplay chart. It also appeared on the Rhythmic Top 40 at number 20. The song was ranked 72nd on the Hot R&B/Hip-Hop Singles 2004 year-end chart.

Music video 
 The music video for "U Should've Known Better" was shot by director Benny Boom, and produced by Joyce Washington for FM Rocks. It was filmed in various locations throughout Mexico, in April 2004, and features rapper Young Buck appears in the video as her love interest.

The video follows the single's topic of a misunderstandings in a relationship, showing Monica as the girlfriend, with the boyfriend held in a Mexico hold-prison. With Monica getting help from a guy friend, her boyfriend's best friend sees them and thinks otherwise. Monica drives through the desert of Mexico to get him out of prison. The video ends with Monica and her boyfriend hugging at the end and going home together.

The "U Should've Known Better" video premiered worldwide in May 2004 at the end on BET's Access Granted. It charted well on several video-chart countdowns, including BET's 106 & Park and MTV's TRL.

Track listings

US promo CD
 "U Should've Known Better" (radio edit) – 4:17
 "U Should've Known Better" (radio edit without guitar) – 4:17
 "U Should've Known Better" (instrumental) – 4:45
 "U Should've Known Better" (call-out hook) – 0:10

US 12-inch vinyl
A1. "U Should've Known Better" (DIO club mix) – 7:11
A2. "U Should've Known Better" (DIO radio mix) – 3:58
B1. "U Should've Known Better" (Bass / Fonseca Mixshow) – 5:39
B2. "U Should've Known Better" (Bass / Fonseca instrumental) – 3:42
B3. "U Should've Known Better" (Bass / Fonseca radio) – 3:41

Credits and personnel
Credits for After the Storm are adapted from the album's liner notes.

 Lead vocals – Monica Arnold
 Background vocals – Monica Arnold
 Mixing – Phil Tan, Jermaine Dupri
 Mixing assistance – John Horesco IV

 Guitar – William Odum
 Recording – Brian Frye at SouthSide Studios, Atlanta, Georgia
 Recording assistance – Tadd Mingo, Javier Valeverde
 Mastering – Tom Coyne

Charts

Weekly charts

Year-end charts

Release history

References

External links
 Monica.com — official Monica site

2000s ballads
2002 songs
2004 singles
Contemporary R&B ballads
J Records singles
Monica (singer) songs
Music videos directed by Benny Boom
Song recordings produced by Jermaine Dupri
Songs written by Harold Lilly (songwriter)
Songs written by Jermaine Dupri
Songs written by Monica (singer)